The R551 road is a regional road in Ireland, linking Tarbert and Tralee in County Kerry.

Route
It starts in Tarbert and runs via Ballylongford, Astee, Derra, Doon, Ballybunion, Gortnaskeha, Gortagurrane West, Ferry Bridge, Ballyduff, Glanerdalliv Bridge, Causeway, Dirtane, Ballyheigue and Ardfert to Tralee.

See also
Roads in Ireland
National primary road
National secondary road

References
Roads Act 1993 (Classification of Regional Roads) Order 2006 – Department of Transport

Regional roads in the Republic of Ireland
Roads in County Kerry